Baoguo Temple or , may refer to:

 Baoguo Temple (Zhejiang), in Ningbo, Zhejiang, China
 Baoguo Temple (Mount Emei), on Mount Emei, Sichuan, China

Buddhist temple disambiguation pages